University of Jember (abbreviated as UNEJ) is a university in Jember Regency, Indonesia. This university is located on Jalan Kalimantan, Jember. It has several faculties including education and law. It was established on November 10, 1964.

Dr. Ir. Iwan Taruna, M.Eng, IPM is appointed as the University's Rector.

Alumni 

 Gatot Sudjito
 Adek Berry
Charles Meikyansah

References

External links

Universities and colleges in Indonesia
Indonesian state universities